Rahmatabad-e Salehiha (also Romanized as Raḩmatābād-e Şāleḥīhā; also known as Raḩmatābād-e Do Chāhī) is a village in Pariz Rural District, Pariz District, Sirjan County, Kerman Province, Iran. At the 2006 census, its population was 187, in 48 families.

References 

Populated places in Sirjan County